Elections to Ards Borough Council were held on 19 May 1993 on the same day as the other Northern Irish local government elections. The election used four district electoral areas to elect a total of 23 councillors.

Election results

Note: "Votes" are the first preference votes.

Districts summary

|- class="unsortable" align="centre"
!rowspan=2 align="left"|Ward
! % 
!Cllrs
! % 
!Cllrs
! %
!Cllrs
! %
!Cllrs
!rowspan=2|TotalCllrs
|- class="unsortable" align="center"
!colspan=2 bgcolor="" | UUP
!colspan=2 bgcolor="" | DUP
!colspan=2 bgcolor="" | Alliance
!colspan=2 bgcolor="white"| Others
|-
|align="left"|Ards East
|bgcolor="40BFF5"|45.7
|bgcolor="40BFF5"|3
|31.7
|2
|15.0
|1
|7.6
|0
|6
|-
|align="left"|Ards West
|bgcolor="40BFF5"|44.7
|bgcolor="40BFF5"|3
|24.4
|1
|25.0
|2
|5.9
|0
|6
|-
|align="left"|Newtownards
|27.4
|2
|bgcolor="#D46A4C"|28.2
|bgcolor="#D46A4C"|2
|16.5
|1
|27.9
|1
|6
|-
|align="left"|Peninsula
|20.4
|1
|28.9
|1
|bgcolor="#F6CB2F"|36.9
|bgcolor="#F6CB2F"|2
|13.8
|1
|5
|- class="unsortable" class="sortbottom" style="background:#C9C9C9"
|align="left"| Total
|34.7
|9
|28.3
|6
|23.4
|6
|13.6
|2
|23
|-
|}

Districts results

Ards East

1993: 3 x UUP, 2 x DUP, 1 x Alliance

Ards West

1993: 3 x UUP, 2 x Alliance, 1 x DUP

Newtownards

1993: 2 x UUP, 2 x DUP, 1 x Alliance, 1 x Independent Unionist

Peninsula

1993: 2 x Alliance, 1 x DUP, 1 x UUP, 1 x Independent

References

Ards Borough Council elections
Ards